Zinc finger protein 112 is a protein that in humans is encoded by the ZNF112 gene.

References

Further reading 

Molecular biology
Proteins
Proteomics